Empress Nguyễn may refer to:

Nguyễn Thị Sen ( 970), one of the five concurrent empresses of Đinh Bộ Lĩnh
Nguyễn Thị Anh (1422–1459), consort of Lê Thái Tông and mother of Lê Nhân Tông
Nguyễn Thị Hằng (1441–1505), concubine of Lê Thánh Tông and mother of Lê Hiến Tông
Nguyễn Thị Đạo (died 1516), Lê Tương Dực's wife
Nguyễn Thị Ngọc Tuyền ( 1527), Mạc Thái Tổ's wife and Mạc Thái Tông's mother
Empress Nguyễn (Mạc Mậu Hợp) (died 1600), Mạc Mậu Hợp's wife 
Nguyễn Thị Ngọc Đoan (died 1799), concubine of Lê Chiêu Thống and mother of Lê Chiêu Thống
Nguyễn Thị Hoàn (1736–1811), empress dowager of the Nguyễn dynasty, Gia Long's mother
Nguyễn Hữu Thị Nhàn (1870–1935), empress dowager and grand empress dowager of the Nguyễn dynasty, Khải Định's stepmother
Nam Phương (1914–1963), empress consort of the Nguyễn dynasty, Bảo Đại's wife

See also
Empress Dowager Nguyễn

Nguyễn